The 2017–18 UMass Minutemen basketball team represented the University of Massachusetts Amherst during the 2017–18 NCAA Division I men's basketball season. The Minutemen were led by first-year head coach Matt McCall and played their home games at the William D. Mullins Memorial Center in Amherst, Massachusetts as members of the Atlantic 10 Conference. They finished the season 13–20, 5–13 in A-10 play to finish in 13th place. They beat La Salle in the first round of the A-10 tournament before losing in the second round to George Mason.

Previous season
The Minutemen finished the 2016–17 season 15–18, 4–14 in A-10 play to finish in a 12th place. They defeated Saint Joseph's in the first round of the A-10 tournament before losing to St. Bonaventure.

On March 9, 2017, the school fired head coach Derek Kellogg after nine years and a 155–137 record. Shortly after Kellogg was fired, the school announced that Winthrop head coach Pat Kelsey had been hired as the new head coach at UMass. However, shortly before the press conference to announce his hiring, Kelsey announced he would not accept the position. On March 31, the school announced they had hired Chattanooga head coach Matt McCall.

Offseason

Departures

Incoming transfers

2017 recruiting class

2018 recruiting class

Preseason 
In a poll of the league’s head coaches and select media members at the conference's media day, the Minutemen were picked to finish in 12th place in the A-10.

Roster

Schedule and results

|-
!colspan=9 style=| Exhibition

|-
!colspan=9 style=| Non-conference regular season

|-
!colspan=12 style=| A-10 regular season

|-
!colspan=9 style=| A-10 tournament

See also
 2017–18 UMass Minutewomen basketball team

References

UMass Minutemen basketball seasons
Umass